Ripley is a suburb in the City of Ipswich, Queensland, Australia.

Geography 
The eastern boundary of Ripley is aligned with Bundamba Creek.  The Centenary Highway passes through the south east corner of Ripley. Ripley is located within the Ripley Valley, and takes its name from the valley.

History 
Ripley is situated in the Yugarabul traditional Indigenous Australian country. 

The historical settlement of Ripley dates back to the mid-1800s as a farming community.

Bundamba Upper State School opened on 2 February 1874. In 1909, it was renamed Ripley State School. It closed in 1930 due to low student numbers. It was at 1166-1176 Ripley Road in neighbouring South Ripley.

Cityhope Church was built in 1998 by a congregation established in Ipswich in the mid 1960s.

In 2007 it was announced that Ripley would be a master-planned urban development.

Ripley urban development
The Ripley area is part of the Brisbane metropolitan western growth corridor project. The development, known as Ecco Ripley is in response to the local and state governments' solicitation for land releases to alleviate expected and forecasted population growth from the general population growth of the existing communities, as well as growth from interstate and overseas migration.

Once the area is fully developed, the Ripley district is expected to have a population of 120,000 people with an estimated 50,000 residential dwellings. The city development will provide employment with 200,000 job positions estimated. The Ripley development is in proximity of the suburbs and areas within the western growth corridor and Ripley district, such as South Ripley, Swanbank, Deebing Heights and White Rock, with suitable land for new residential, business and industrial developments.

The development is to be the country's largest planned community.

Transport 
Ripley is serviced by bus route 531 between Springfield Central and Yamanto.

Planned transportation links includes an extension of the Springfield railway line to Ipswich, and commuter railway stations between Ipswich and Springfield.

Education
A government primary school named Ripley Central State School had opened in Ripley for Term 1 in January, 2023, situated on Binnies Road. The school had underwent proposal and planning prior to construction, including approval by the Ipswich City Council. Ripley Valley State School and Ripley Valley State Secondary College are located in the adjacent suburb of South Ripley.

Amenities 
Cityhope Church is at 7 Rex Hills Drive. It is affiliated with the Australian Christian Churches.

References

Further reading 

 

Suburbs of Ipswich, Queensland